Heart of the World is an 1895 book by H. Rider Haggard about a lost Mayan city in Mexico. Its importance in the history of fantasy literature was recognized by its republication by the Newcastle Publishing Company as the tenth volume of the Newcastle Forgotten Fantasy Library in September, 1976.

Reception
In his study of early science fiction, E. F. Bleiler described Heart of the World as "rich in detail, ingenious and well plotted, but weak in characterization at times. Bleiler also wrote that the novel's  "moral message" and its "sense of tragedy" were both "powerfully conveyed".

References

External links
 
 
Images and bibliographic information for various editions of Heart of the World at SouthAfricaBooks.com

Novels by H. Rider Haggard
1895 British novels
1895 fantasy novels
British adventure novels
British fantasy novels
Novels set in Mexico